Events from the year 1528 in Ireland.

Incumbent 
Lord: Henry VIII

Events 

 Conchobhar mac Toirdhealbaig Ó Briain becomes the last King of Thomond
 John Alen, Primate of Ireland appointed Lord Chancellor of Ireland

Deaths

References 

 
1520s in Ireland
Ireland
Years of the 16th century in Ireland